Severomorsk is a . The ship entered service with the Soviet Navy in 1987 and after the breakup of the Soviet Union, became part of the Russian Navy.

Development and design 

Project 1155 dates to the 1970s when it was concluded that it was too costly to build large-displacement, multi-role combatants. The concept of a specialized surface ship was developed by Soviet designers.

Construction and career 
Severomorsk was laid down on 12 June 1984 and launched on 24 December 1985 by Severnaya Verf in Saint Petersburg. She was commissioned on 30 December 1987.

On 4 October 2017, a detachment of ships led by Severomorsk arrived at the main base of the Northern Fleet, Severomorsk, after successfully completing exercises in the Arctic Ocean.

Beginning on 5 July 2018, the destroyer began a long voyage, visiting ports in Algeria, Victoria, Australia, Pemba and Antsiranana. Severomorsk took part in the Russian-Japanese naval anti-piracy exercises in the Gulf of Aden and then in Russian-Pakistani exercises on anti-piracy activities Arabian Monsoon 2018.

On 8 January 2019, the ship passed the Dardanelles and entered the Sea of Marmara. On 10 January, the ship arrived at Sevastopol to restore technical readiness, after which it continued a long sea voyage. At the beginning of April, Severomorsk performed tasks in the Mediterranean. In mid-2019 she participated in the naval parade in Saint Petersburg.

In mid-2020 Severomorsk was deployed to the Bering Sea via the Northern sea route. Before returning to her homeport at Severomorsk, in November the ship sailed just outside of British territorial waters in the Moray Firth alongside the tanker Sergey Osipov.

In January 2021, she entered the Barents Sea for naval artillery drills.

Gallery

References

External link

1985 ships
Ships built at Severnaya Verf
Cold War destroyers of the Soviet Union
Udaloy-class destroyers